Sonny Colbrelli (born 17 May 1990) is a retired Italian professional road bicycle racer who most recently rode for UCI WorldTeam .

Career
Born in Desenzano del Garda, Colbrelli has competed as a professional since the start of the 2012 season, joining  as a neo-pro, from the  amateur squad. Colbrelli had previously competed for the team in two stagiaire spells at the end of the 2010 and 2011 seasons.

Colbrelli made his Grand Tour début at the 2012 Giro d'Italia, where he was earmarked as a lead-out man for the team's sprinter, Sacha Modolo; Colbrelli took his first top ten placing on stage 13, when he finished ninth having led out Modolo to a fourth-place finish.

Bahrain–Merida (2017–2022)
In June 2017, he was named in the startlist for the Tour de France.

2021 season
After three top-ten finishes in one-day races during the opening quarter of the year, Colbrelli took stage victories at the Tour de Romandie and the Critérium du Dauphiné, winning the points classification at both races. He then won the Italian National Road Race Championships for the first time, outsprinting Fausto Masnada, after both riders attacked on the final lap of a hilly course in and around Imola. He took three top-five stage finishes at the Tour de France, as he finished third in the points classification, behind Mark Cavendish and Michael Matthews. He next started at the Benelux Tour, where he won the sixth stage after a  solo attack into Houffalize. Assuming the race leader's blue jersey for the final stage, which included three ascents of the Muur van Geraardsbergen, Colbrelli finished second on the stage behind teammate Matej Mohorič, but Mohorič did not gain enough time to take the overall victory.

The following weekend, Colbrelli formed part of an eight-man Italian team for the road race at the UEC European Road Championships, held in Trento. On the third of eight laps of a  finishing circuit, Colbrelli joined compatriot Matteo Trentin as part of a ten-rider lead group; he, and France's Benoît Cosnefroy, later followed an attack by Belgium's Remco Evenepoel on the penultimate lap. Once Cosnefroy was dropped, Colbrelli tactically sat on Evenepoel's wheel and refused to relay with him; at the finish, Colbrelli led into the final corner and pulled clear of Evenepoel to win the gold medal. Ahead of the UCI Road World Championships, Colbrelli finished second to Michael Valgren at the Coppa Sabatini, and he won the Memorial Marco Pantani.

As one of the leaders for the Italian team at the World Championships, Colbrelli was unable to follow the attacks in the closing laps, and ultimately finished tenth in the road race. Colbrelli's next start came at Paris–Roubaix, which had been delayed from April to October due to the COVID-19 pandemic in France, and was held in wet conditions that made some of the cobbled sectors muddy and slippery. Colbrelli attacked several times with around  remaining, before forming a group with Mathieu van der Poel and Guillaume Boivin. This trio later caught Florian Vermeersch and Tom Van Asbroeck from the original breakaway, leaving just Gianni Moscon clear with  remaining. Moscon suffered a mechanical and a crash in the next few kilometres, which ultimately led to him being caught on the Carrefour de l'Arbre cobbled sector by Colbrelli, van der Poel and Vermeersch. Once Moscon was dropped, the remaining trio contested the sprint at Roubaix Velodrome. As the finish approached the three mud-covered riders slowed to almost half speed and watched one another; Vermeersch was first to launch the sprint, however Colbrelli went round the outside of him in the closing metres to take the victory. Upon crossing the line he came to a stop, hoisted his bike in the air like a trophy, collapsed and wept as van der Poel, who finished 3rd, collapsed on the infield grass. As a result, Colbrelli became the first Italian rider to win the race since Andrea Tafi in 1999, and the third rider to win in his first start in the race.

2022 season
Colbrelli began his season by finishing second in the Omloop Het Nieuwsblad. However, he was forced to withdraw from Paris–Nice after suffering from bronchitis, which also prevented him from competing in Milan–San Remo.

Cardiac arrest 
He made his return to racing at the Volta a Catalunya on 21 March 2022 (two days after Milan–San Remo), sprinting to second place on the opening stage. However, after the stage, he collapsed, fell unconscious, and required emergency medical treatment before being transferred to a Josep Trueta Hospital in a conscious and stable condition for further assessments. It was later revealed that Colbrelli suffered a cardiac arrhythmia that lead to cardiac arrest and has paused his training and competition to recover.

In 1 April 2022, Colbrelli received a subcutaneous implantable defibrillator (ICD) to reset his heart rhythm in case he suffers another cardiac arrest, thus making him unfit to participate in high intensity, competitive sports due to Italian Cardiological Guidelines for Competitive Sports Eligibility for athletes with heart disease (COCIS). As a result of his hiatus, Colbrelli was unable to defend his Paris-Roubaix title.

The incident drew comparisons to Christian Eriksen, a professional footballer who also suffered cardiac arrest and collapsed during physical activity.

In October 2022, Sonny Colbrelli announced that he will retire due to heart problems.

Major results

2009
 2nd Giro del Veneto
2010
 1st Trofeo Alcide Degasperi
 6th Road race, UCI Under-23 Road World Championships
 7th Circuito del Porto
2011
 2nd Trofeo Zsšdi
 2nd Trofeo Banca Popolare di Vicenza
 3rd Trofeo Franco Balestra
 3rd Gran Premio della Liberazione
 10th Overall Coupe des nations Ville Saguenay
2012
 1st Stage 1b (TTT) Giro di Padania
 2nd Coppa Bernocchi
 9th Gran Premio Bruno Beghelli
2013
 2nd Volta Limburg Classic
 2nd Tour of Almaty
 5th Gran Premio Bruno Beghelli
 7th Ronde van Drenthe
 8th Gran Premio Industria e Commercio di Prato
2014
 1st Giro dell'Appennino
 1st Memorial Marco Pantani
 1st Gran Premio Industria e Commercio di Prato
 1st Coppa Sabatini
 1st Stage 2 Tour of Slovenia
 2nd Gran Premio di Lugano
 2nd Volta Limburg Classic
 2nd Tre Valli Varesine
 3rd Roma Maxima
 4th Trofeo Laigueglia
 5th Gran Premio Città di Camaiore
 5th Grand Prix Pino Cerami
 6th Milan–San Remo
2015
 1st Coppa Italia
 1st  Overall Tour du Limousin
1st  Young rider classification
1st Stage 1
 1st Gran Premio Bruno Beghelli
 3rd Gran Piemonte
 5th Gran Premio della Costa Etruschi
 5th Coppa Ugo Agostoni
 6th Gran Premio Industria e Commercio di Prato
 6th Coppa Sabatini
 10th Coppa Bernocchi
2016
 1st Gran Premio di Lugano
 1st Coppa Ugo Agostoni
 1st Coppa Sabatini
 1st Tre Valli Varesine
 1st Stage 5 Tour du Poitou-Charentes
 2nd Overall Tour du Limousin
1st Stages 3 & 4
 2nd Overall Giro di Toscana
 2nd Trofeo Laigueglia
 2nd Volta Limburg Classic
 3rd Amstel Gold Race
 4th Gran Premio Bruno Beghelli
 5th Gran Piemonte
 6th Brabantse Pijl
 9th Milan–San Remo
2017
 1st Brabantse Pijl
 1st Coppa Bernocchi
 1st Stage 2 Paris–Nice
 2nd Coppa Sabatini
 2nd Gran Premio Bruno Beghelli
 3rd Bretagne Classic
 5th Memorial Marco Pantani
 7th E3 Harelbeke
 9th Amstel Gold Race
 10th Tour of Flanders
 10th Grand Prix Cycliste de Québec
2018
 1st Gran Piemonte
 1st Coppa Bernocchi
 1st Stage 3 Tour de Suisse
 2nd Grand Prix Cycliste de Montréal
 2nd Brabantse Pijl
 2nd Coppa Sabatini
 3rd Overall Dubai Tour
1st Stage 4
 3rd Kuurne–Brussels–Kuurne
 8th Omloop Het Nieuwsblad
 9th Milan–San Remo
2019
 1st Gran Premio Bruno Beghelli
 1st Stage 4 Tour of Oman
 2nd Road race, National Road Championships
 2nd Overall Deutschland Tour
1st  Points classification
1st Stage 4
 2nd Coppa Sabatini
 5th Memorial Marco Pantani
 8th Trofeo Matteotti
 9th EuroEyes Cyclassics
2020
 1st Stage 2 Route d'Occitanie
 3rd Road race, National Road Championships
 4th Brabantse Pijl
 6th Overall BinckBank Tour
 7th Kuurne–Brussels–Kuurne
2021
 1st  Road race, UEC European Road Championships
 1st  Road race, National Road Championships
 1st  Overall Benelux Tour
1st Stage 6
 1st Paris–Roubaix
 1st Memorial Marco Pantani
 Tour de Romandie
1st  Points classification
1st Stage 2
 Critérium du Dauphiné
1st  Points classification
1st Stage 3
 2nd Coppa Sabatini
 4th Gent–Wevelgem
 6th Kuurne–Brussels–Kuurne
 8th Milan–San Remo
 10th Road race, UCI Road World Championships
2022
 2nd Omloop Het Nieuwsblad

Grand Tour general classification results timeline

Classics results timeline

Major championships timeline

References

External links

Colnago CSF-Bardiani profile

Italian male cyclists
1990 births
Living people
People from Desenzano del Garda
Cyclists from the Province of Brescia
Tour de Suisse stage winners